B74 or B-74 may refer to:
 Bundesstraße 74, a German road
 B74 (New York City bus), in Brooklyn
 Sicilian Defense, Dragon Variation, according to the Encyclopaedia of Chess Openings
 Sutton Coldfield in the list of postal districts in the United Kingdom
 GER Class B74, a class of British steam locomotives